Scapozygoceropsis albertisi is a species of beetle in the family Cerambycidae, and the only species in the genus Scapozygoceropsis. It was described by Stephan von Breuning in 1973.

References

Beetles described in 1973